Oscar Charles Dessomville (19 August 1876 – 30 August 1938) was a Belgian rower who competed in the 1900 Summer Olympics and in the 1908 Summer Olympics.

In both 1900 and 1908 he was the only one with Rodolphe Poma, who was coxswain in 1900, who was both two times part of the Belgian boat Royal Club Nautique de Gand, which won the silver medal in the men's eight.

References

External links

1876 births
1938 deaths
Belgian male rowers
Olympic rowers of Belgium
Rowers at the 1900 Summer Olympics
Rowers at the 1908 Summer Olympics
Olympic silver medalists for Belgium
Royal Club Nautique de Gand rowers
Olympic medalists in rowing
Medalists at the 1908 Summer Olympics
Medalists at the 1900 Summer Olympics
European Rowing Championships medalists
20th-century Belgian people